Gol Gol-e Sofla or Golgol-e Sofla may refer to:

Gol Gol-e Sofla, Abdanan, Ilam Province
Gol Gol-e Sofla, Malekshahi, Ilam Province
Gol Gol-e Sofla, Lorestan